Torn from the Flag is a 2007 documentary film about the international decline of communism and the 1956 Hungarian Revolution. The film encompasses the tense Cold War era (1945–1991) and presents the rivalry of the superpowers during that time. It shows the 1956 Hungarian Revolution as the first catalyst for the future decline of the communist system, and as a remarkable turning point for the advancement of democracy. The film's Hungarian title is A lyukas zászló.

Torn from the Flag was made primarily for international theatrical release and television distribution.

Accolades
The film's world premiere was in Hollywood, in the American Film Institute’s film festival, AFI Fest. It was screened in the festival’s "Milestones" section—described as "celebrating the best of the best"—along with films by Ingmar Bergman and Michelangelo Antonioni. Tickets for the premiere sold out in 45 minutes, and the film received a standing ovation. To date, the film has been invited to participate in 20 festivals, and is the recipient of 8 awards and recognition.

References

 The Hollywood Reporter
 LA Weekly
 The Budapest Times
 MovieMaker Magazine
 Congressional Record of the United States America
 American Cinematographer

External links
 Official Website
 
 The director-producer-writer's homepage

2007 films
American documentary films
Documentary films about the Cold War
Hungarian Revolution of 1956 films
Documentary films about Hungary
2000s American films